The Romanian women's national 3x3 team represents Romania in international 3x3 basketball matches and is controlled by the Romanian Basketball Federation.

Tournament record

Summer Olympics

World Cup

European Championship

See also
 3x3 basketball
 Romania men's national 3x3 team

References

External links
 

B 3x3
Women's national 3x3 basketball teams